The Skvira uezd was one of the subdivisions of the Kiev Governorate of the Russian Empire. It was situated in the western part of the governorate. Its administrative centre was Skvira (Skvyra).

Demographics
At the time of the Russian Empire Census of 1897, Skvirsky Uyezd had a population of 251,257. Of these, 83.5% spoke Ukrainian, 12.5% Yiddish, 2.4% Polish, 1.3% Russian and 0.1% German as their native language.

References

 
Uezds of Kiev Governorate
1795 establishments in the Russian Empire
1923 disestablishments in Ukraine